Haplotrachelus is a genus of beetles in the family Carabidae, containing the following species:

 Haplotrachelus atropis (H. W. Bates, 1875)
 Haplotrachelus capicola (Dejean, 1831)
 Haplotrachelus dregei Chaudoir, 1879
 Haplotrachelus holcopleurus Chaudoir, 1855
 Haplotrachelus ignobilis Chaudoir, 1879
 Haplotrachelus laevis Bänninger, 1932
 Haplotrachelus latesulcatus (H. W. Bates, 1875)
 Haplotrachelus lissotonus Basilewsky, 1958
 Haplotrachelus meracus Péringuey, 1899
 Haplotrachelus ovipennis (Chaudoir, 1843)
 Haplotrachelus oviventris Chaudoir, 1879
 Haplotrachelus pasimachoides Chaudoir, 1879
 Haplotrachelus patruelis Chaudoir, 1855
 Haplotrachelus planatus Bänninger, 1935
 Haplotrachelus polypleurus (H. W. Bates. 1875)
 Haplotrachelus pondoanus Bänninger, 1935
 Haplotrachelus punctuliger (H. W. Bates, 1875)
 Haplotrachelus subcrenatus Chaudoir, 1855
 Haplotrachelus transvaalensis Chaudoir, 1879
 Haplotrachelus wiedemanni (Crotch, 1871)

References

Scaritinae